The slender giant moray or Gangetic moray, Strophidon sathete, is the longest member of the family of moray eels. It is in the genus Strophidon. The longest recorded specimen was caught in 1927, on the Maroochy River in Queensland; it measured 3.94 metres. This species is characterized by an elongated body, as well as brownish-grey dorsal coloration which pales towards the venter.

Distribution and habitat
The slender giant moray is found in the Indo-West Pacific Ocean from the Red Sea and East Africa to the western Pacific. It generally lives in the benthic muddy environments of marine and estuarine areas, including inner bays and rivers.

References

Notes

External links 
 

Muraenidae
Fish described in 1822